Vert or Verts may refer to:

 Vert (heraldry), the colour green in heraldry
 Vert (music producer) (born 1972), pseudonym of Adam Butler, an English music producer
 Vert (river), in southern France
 Vert (sport), a competition in extreme versions of BMX, snowboarding etc., held on a vert ramp
 Vert, Landes, a commune in the Landes département in France
 Vert, Yvelines, a commune in the Yvelines département in France
 The Greens (France) (Les Verts), a political party 
 Lac Vert (disambiguation) or Vert Lake, the name of various lakes